The Ipswich state by-election, 1949 was a by-election held on 10 September 1949 for the Queensland Legislative Assembly seat of Ipswich, based in the centre of Ipswich to the south-west of Brisbane. At the time of the election, the seat included the suburbs of Ipswich, Booval, Bundamba, Newtown, Silkstone, West Ipswich, Woodend and part of East Ipswich.

The by-election was triggered by the death of Labor member and Attorney-General of Queensland David Gledson on 14 May 1949. Gledson had held the seat since the 1915 election, with one brief interruption during the Great Depression. It was expected to be retained by the party.

Timeline

Candidates 
The by-election attracted three candidates. The Labor Party nominated Ivor Marsden, the Liberal Party nominated Graham Stephenson, while the Communist Party nominated Edmund Crisp. It was the first electoral contest held since the Queensland People's Party became the Liberal Party's Queensland branch, along with the Kurilpa state by-election held on the same day.

Results
Ivor Marsden retained the seat for the Labor Party.

Aftermath 
Ivor Marsden held the seat and its successor, Ipswich West, until his retirement from politics at the 1966 election.

See also
List of Queensland state by-elections

References 

1949 elections in Australia
Queensland state by-elections
1940s in Queensland
September 1949 events in Australia